Martina (Romansh; rare German: Martinsbruck) is a village in the Lower Engadine valley, in Graubünden, Switzerland. Its border crossing leads to Nauders in Austria. The village was part of the municipality of Tschlin, now is part of Valsot.

The language spoken here is Vallader, the local dialect of Romansch.

References

External links

Valsot
Villages in Graubünden
Populated places on the Inn (river)